The Lamas Province is one of ten provinces of the San Martín Region in northern Peru.

Political division
The province is divided into eleven districts, which are:

Lamas
Alonso de Alvarado
Barranquita
Caynarachi
Cuñumbuqui
Pinto Recodo
Rumisapa
San Roque de Cumbaza
Shanao
Tabalosos
Zapatero

Provinces of the San Martín Region